Sasso Marconi is a town and comune of the Metropolitan City of Bologna in northern Italy,  south-southwest of Bologna.

Known as Sasso Bolognese until 1938, it is named after Guglielmo Marconi, the radio pioneer, who was born in the nearby city of Bologna. His villa now contains the Marconi Museum and Mausoleum. The name Sasso ("rock") derives from the Pliocenic rock formation called Sasso della Glosina that commands the confluence of the Setta and Reno rivers.

Twin cities
   Helston, UK   
   Sassenage, France   
 Siderno, Italy

References

Cities and towns in Emilia-Romagna